The Texas Rangers' 2011 season was the 51st season in the overall history of the franchise and the 40th since the team relocated to Arlington, Texas. At the season outset, the Rangers were the defending American League champions.

Despite playing during one of the hottest summers on record in Texas, the Rangers claimed their second consecutive American League West division title (fifth overall) and set franchise records for wins (96 wins and a .593 winning percentage, one win better than the previous record set in 1999) and home attendance (2,946,949 fans at Rangers Ballpark in Arlington, breaking the old record set in 1997). Another year of improvement from the starting pitching and defense would give the Rangers the most shutouts in the American League, and they trailed the Philadelphia Phillies by only two for the Major League Baseball (MLB) lead. All five members of the opening day starting rotation would stay in the rotation for the entire year. C. J. Wilson tied for the league lead in starts with 34 while Derek Holland tied for second in shutouts with four, tied for first in the American League, and each pitcher would have at least 13 wins. The offense, always considered a strong point for the team, would also have another good year with three players getting 30+ home runs, and Ian Kinsler completing his second 30–30 season.

The Rangers won their second straight AL West title, and beat the Tampa Bay Rays in four games and the Detroit Tigers in six to advance to the 2011 World Series. They lost to the St. Louis Cardinals in seven games, their second straight defeat in the Fall Classic, becoming the first team to lose back-to-back World Series since the Atlanta Braves in 1991 and 1992. The World Series was notable for the Rangers being one strike away from winning the series twice in Game 6 with a two-run lead each time before ultimately losing to the Cardinals 10–9 in an 11-inning thriller. They would go on to lose Game 7 by a score of 6–2. To date, the Rangers possess the second-longest World Series win drought after the Cleveland Indians and also the second-longest amount of time it has taken a North American professional sports franchise to win its first league title after the Philadelphia Phillies, leading many to consider the Rangers to be amongst the most-cursed North American pro sports teams.

Offseason
The biggest free agent pitcher of the 2011 market was Cliff Lee. According to major media markets, Lee's most likely destination for 2011 was a return to Texas, or signing with the New York Yankees. Bob Simpson, a lead investor of Rangers Baseball Express which owns the Rangers, told media "We're going to go after Cliff Lee – hard, and we have the financial firepower to do that." After an extended process which included a flight by principal owner Chuck Greenberg, team investor Ray Davis, and assistant GM Thad Levine to meet with Lee, his wife, and agent following the winter meeting, Lee signed a five-year deal with the Phillies to return to the team which traded him away at the start of the 2010 season.

On November 3, 2010, the Rangers declined to exercise their 2011 option on Vladimir Guerrero's contract. Guerrero was a type A free agent but the Rangers would not receive draft pick compensation for Guerrero after he signed with the Baltimore Orioles.

Scott Feldman underwent surgery to repair torn cartilage in his right knee. The rehab time for the surgery will prevent Feldman from returning to compete for a rotation spot for the start of the season. Feldman was the Texas Rangers' pitcher of the year in 2009 and opening day starter for 2010, but failed to repeat his success in 2010 after signing a three-year extension.

For the second year in a row, the Rangers needed to fill the position of hitting coach after Clint Hurdle took the manager position with the Pittsburgh Pirates. The Rangers signed Thad Bosley. Bosley was a member of the A's coaching staff during Washington's time with the A's, and was also teammates with first base coach Gary Pettis in the Rangers organization during his final playing year.

The Rangers signed two players in November: 34-year-old free agent Japanese pitcher Yoshinori Tateyama, a side-arm throwing relief pitcher, and catcher Yorvit Torrealba from the San Diego Padres.  Torrealba was a type B free agent and did not cost the Rangers a draft pick for the signing.  Bengie Molina, the Rangers' primary catcher in 2010, elected to retire.

On December 26, the Rangers and pitcher Brandon Webb agreed to terms for a one-year contract. Webb, who was recovering from shoulder surgery, had not pitched in the majors since opening day of 2009.

The Rangers' biggest free agent move for the 2011 season would be the signing of third baseman Adrián Beltré. The six-year, $96 million deal would force incumbent veteran Michael Young into his fourth position with the Rangers. Although Young was hesitant to make another position move, Young told the Rangers and the media he was willing to switch to designated hitter in order for the Rangers to sign Beltre. With the signing of Beltre and move of Young, the Rangers did not continue to attempt to re-sign Guerrero, who would sign a one-year deal with the Orioles.

In late January the Rangers made their biggest trade of the offseason when long-time trade target Mike Napoli was acquired from the Toronto Blue Jays for relief pitcher Frank Francisco. Napoli became available to the Rangers after being sent to the Blue Jays with Juan Rivera just three days earlier in exchange for Vernon Wells. The weakening of the bullpen from the loss of Francisco would not be the biggest problem from the Napoli trade as DH utility infielder Michael Young would demand his second trade request in three years. After a press conference in which Rangers president Nolan Ryan and GM Jon Daniels acknowledged Young's trade request, indicating Young had a change of heart after initially agreeing to be the primary designated hitter, Young fired back telling the press

Although trade rumors concerning Young would continue after his demand, as it did during and after the winter meetings, no trade would be forthcoming and Young reported for Spring training on time.

Spring training
With an infield and outfield set, and multiple players able to cover in different positions, the rotation and bullpen would be the biggest questions for the front office to handle. C. J. Wilson was named the opening day starter early on, followed by Colby Lewis and Tommy Hunter. Free agent Brandon Webb would continue to prepare for a return to baseball, but would not be ready in time for opening day and would start the season on the disabled list. An injury to Hunter would place him on the disabled list to start the season, and Matt Harrison, who had earned the fourth spot, would be moved to third. The remaining candidates, Derek Holland, Michael Kirkman, Eric Hurley, and closer Neftalí Feliz, would continue to compete for the final two spots. Kirkman and Hurley were sent to AAA, and Feliz was returned to the closer role due to a weakened bullpen. Reliever Alexi Ogando would be the number 5 starter behind Holland to start the season.

On March 11, just 220 days after acquiring the team from auction, Chuck Greenberg would resign as CEO from the Rangers. The resignation came about due to different management styles between Greenberg and president Nolan Ryan. Ryan added the CEO title to his position.

Although the rift between Greenberg and Ryan were never publicly discussed by the Rangers, reports indicated two major events that might have directly led to the removal of Greenberg, Greenberg's involvement with additional attempts to sign Cliff Lee, and his involvement with potential Young trades after Young demanded a trade, most specifically that Greenberg demanded Young forfeit deferred interest due to him by the Rangers. The demand would have been a violation of the MLB CBA.

During spring training GM Jon Daniels and Young met twice to discuss the situation leading to Young's trade demand. Daniels said it was the Rangers' continued trade discussions after Young being told he would not be traded once third baseman Adrián Beltré was acquired that helped lead to the trade demand.

The Rangers later traded Matt Treanor to the Kansas City Royals (Treanor would later be traded back to the Rangers at the end of August).

Regular season

April
Record 16–11

Rotation: C. J. Wilson, Colby Lewis, Matt Harrison, Derek Holland, Alexi Ogando, Dave Bush

For the first time under manager Ron Washington the Rangers would finish the month of April with a record above .500. After sweeping the first two series against Boston and Seattle the Rangers would take their first loss of the season against Baltimore in the first game of a double header on April 9 after the series opener was rained out.  The Rangers were the last team in the 2011 season to record a loss and each Ranger starter would get the win from game 2 through game 6, the first team to have 5 different starters win at least 1 game each. After the Baltimore series the Rangers would lose three straight series versus the Tigers, Yankees, and Angels. A sweep of the Royals, a 1–3 series loss to Toronto, and a two-game split with Oakland would finish out the month. The Rangers would spend only one day out of first place for the West in the month.

Ian Kinsler would make Major League history by being the first player to hit a lead off home run in the first two games of a season. Kinsler would also set another record along with Nelson Cruz by being the first teammates to hit at least one home run each in each of the first three games of the season. Cruz would go on to hit a home run in the first four games of the season, only the third player in Major League history, and the first to do so in the American League. Shortstop Elvis Andrus would also hit his first home run since 2009 in the fourth game of the season.

Ogando would make his second start against the Detroit Tigers and earn his second win. In each of his first two starts of the season he went 6+ innings, earned the win, and gave up 2 or fewer hit in each start, joining only 4 other pitchers since 1919 to do so. Ogando would be the first to do so without giving up a run.

On April 12 left fielder Josh Hamilton left the game after a first-inning play at the plate. The Rangers would ultimately lose their second game of the season and Hamilton would be diagnosed with a fracture in his right shoulder. After the game, Hamilton expressed his concern about the play before running calling it a "stupid play" and thinking "I don't want to do this... something is going to happen" but said he listened to his third base coach and ran on the infield foul out.

As a result of the rainout versus Baltimore on April 8, starter Colby Lewis pitched one day later than scheduled. This would force Lewis to miss his next start on April 13 against Detroit and resulted in Lewis missing a second start for the birth of his child. Local blogger and radio shock jock Richie Whitt would criticize the Rangers' and Lewis' decision to take a leave as a result of the birth of Lewis' second child. Whitt pointed out a starter only gets thirty or so chances to impact a baseball game, and since players are paid millions,  the birth of a child should be planned for the off season if need be. Dallas Morning News reporter Evan Grant countered the blog posting stating it was the rain delayed Baltimore game which caused Lewis' next start to be a day later, resulting in Lewis missing his next start to attend the planned birth of his second child. Grant also reported Lewis offered to make a short rested start before the leave to avoid missing a start, and was declined by the Rangers to do so. Dave Bush would get the starts in Lewis' place. Bush would be the last player who started the season on a team's 25-man roster to make his 2011 debut. Left-handed pitcher Michael Kirkman would be called up during Lewis' leave.

On April 15 the Rangers and pitcher Matt Harrison would tie the MLB record by turning 6 double plays in the game. When Lewis returned on April 18, reliver Mark Lowe was optioned to AAA. Rule 5 draft pick Mason Tobin would leave the April 19 game with an injury and be placed on the 60-day DL the next day. Closer Neftalí Feliz would be sent to the 15-day disabled list with shoulder inflammation on April 23 and Darren O'Day would go on the 60-day DL with a torn labrum in his hip. Darren O'Day would also be placed on the 60-day DL on April 27 with a torn labrum in his left hip.

May
Record (month, year): 13–15, 29–26

Rotation: Matt Harrison, Derek Holland, Alexi Ogando, C. J. Wilson, Colby Lewis, Dave Bush

After losing their May 1 game, the Rangers were tied for first place with the Angels until falling to second place on May 5. The Rangers spent the next eleven days out of first place, falling as far as third in the division, but never fell below 2 games behind the Angels and retook the division lead on May 16. The Rangers would finish the month .5 game up on Seattle  and 1 game up on the Angels.

After several weeks of speculation, the Rangers signed Cuban defect Leonys Martín on May 4 for a $15.5 million major league contract and added him to the 40-man roster. The Rangers also recalled Mark Lowe to the majors and option Pedro Strop to AAA.

Closer Neftalí Feliz returned from the DL on May 6. Nelson Cruz was placed on the 15-day DL with a strained right quadriceps muscle on May 7. Craig Gentry was called up to replace Cruz on the roster.

The May 11 day game between the Texas Rangers and Oakland A's was postponed due to rain in the middle of the fourth inning. After a 2-hour, 21-minute delay, the game was called. The Rangers held a commanding 7–0 lead in part due to a Mitch Moreland grand slam, but because the game was called before the end of the fifth inning, all results from the game were voided. Although both teams had the next day off, the game was not able to be made up the following day because the Rangers had played the previous 20 days in a row, and it is against MLBPA rules to play more than 20 days in a row.  The game would instead be made up in on a fateful July 7 day.

Julio Borbon pulled a hamstring during the May 13 game and was placed on the 15-day DL. During this time, all three starting outfielders would be on the DL. Journeyman centerfielder Endy Chávez was called up to replace Borbon. To make room for the addition of Chávez on the 40 man roster, Brandon Webb was placed on the 60 man DL. Chávez had been with the Rangers organization on a minor league contract since 2010 while recovering from a torn ACL suffered during the 2009 season.

The Rangers took first place in the division back on Colby Lewis' first career shutout on May 16.

Josh Hamilton and Nelson Cruz returned to the team from the DL on May 23.

A second Rangers home game was delayed due to rain in May. The 7:00 May 24 game against the Chicago White Sox resulted in fans' evacuating the playing field and being placed in the underground entrances by ballpark officials with a "tornadic supercell" less than 10 miles from the ballpark. The teams played again at 1:00 CST the next day, but the umpiring crew concluded the game should be continued and play resumed after a three-hour delay.

Off the field, on May 26 the Rangers officially removed rookie play-by-play man John Rhadigan from the TV booth and sent him back to the Fox Sports Southwest post-game and pre-game show. Rhadigan had moved to the TV booth to replace long-time play-by-play game caller Josh Lewin, whose contract expired at the end of the 2010 season.  Rhadigan had no play-by-play experience prior to the season, and was often lampooned by fans of the time on the Internet for his in-game mistakes and inability to correctly and timely describe the action on the field.

June
Record (month, year) 14–13, 43–39

Rotation: Alexi Ogando, Derek Holland, C. J. Wilson, Colby Lewis, Matt Harrison

The Rangers would hold onto first place for the entire month of June, but would lead the division by no more than 2.5 during the month and ended with a 1-game lead over the Angels.

After completing his DL stint, centerfielder Julio Borbon was optioned to AAA on June 3. If Borbon had been returned to the ML roster, David Murphy, Endy Chávez, or Craig Gentry would have been removed from the 25 man roster. Although Murphy was having a bad offensive year coming into June, he still represented a better offensive potential than the remaining outfielders, and Gentry was the only right-handed outfielder other than Nelson Cruz. Chavez was out of options and in order to remain in the organization, would have had to have been placed on waivers and options to AAA.

Ian Kinsler went on paternity leave on June 8. The same day the Rangers also announced the dismissal of hitting coach Thad Bosley for communication differences. Beat writer Evan Grant reported after the dismissal one example taking place between Bosley and catcher Yorvit Torrealba.

The Rangers replaced Bosley by promoting AAA hitting coach and former Ranger's player Scott Coolbaugh. Coolbaugh is the third hitting coach in two seasons following Rudy Jaramillo's 14 years as Texas' hitting coach.

Mike Napoli was placed on the 15-day DL on June 12 with a strained left oblique muscle.

Former reliever Alexi Ogando recorded a 7–0 record before losing his first decision to the New York Yankees on June 14. He would lose the next two decisions finishing June with a 7–3 record.

July
Record (month, year) 18–9, 61–48

After ending July 3 tied for first place with the Angels, the Rangers entered the all-star break on a 7-game winning streak. The streak would last another 5 games, the second best winning streak in franchise history. However, the Rangers would get no further than 5 games ahead of the Angels as a result of the streak. The Rangers ended the month 2 games in first place.

Ron Washington and first base coach Gary Pettis were both ejected from the July 3 game after a close call by first base umpire Ángel Hernández. Washington did not engage in the argument between Pettis and Hernández, but began yelling at the umpire after Hernández, according to Washington, "told me my job is to get him (Pettis) off the field. You don't tell me what my job is..... You can't talk to Angel. Angel is the smartest umpire in baseball." Washington was later fined for his comments.

The following day, Washington pinch hit Mike Napoli for designated hitter Michael Young in the 8 inning of a 13–4 win over the Orioles. At the time of his at bat, Young was a home run short of hitting for the cycle, and Washington later admitted his error by lifting Young for Napoli. It was the second time in Washington's tenure as Rangers' manager that he pinch hit for a batter who was one potential at bat away from completing the cycle.

Prior to the non-waiver trading deadline the Rangers picked up Koji Uehara from the Baltimore Orioles in exchange for Chris Davis and Mike Adams from the San Diego Padres.  Arthur Rhodes was released.

Fan's death
Exactly one year and one day after firefighter Tyler Morris fell from the upper deck onto the lower infield seats, another fan fell from the stands. Shannon Stone, also a firefighter, was in attendance at the July 7 game against Oakland. After left fielder Josh Hamilton retrieved a foul ball, he tossed it into the left field seats toward Stone. Stone, who was in attendance with his son, attempted to catch the ball by leaning over the guardrail when he lost his balance and fell head first between the divider separating the left field wall and the stands. Although Stone was conscious when he left the ballpark, he died on the way to the hospital.

The Rangers started a Shannon Stone memorial fund for the family and plans to place a monument at the homeplate entrance of a father and son walking into the ballpark.

All-Star selections
Michael Young DH
Josh Hamilton LF
C. J. Wilson P
Alexi Ogando P
Adrián Beltré 3B

Hamilton was the only Ranger selected by fan voting. Young and Beltre were each selected by player voting. Wilson was selected by Washington. This decision did create some criticizing from media and fans, especially those who wanted Yankees pitcher CC Sabathia selected. However, when Washington made the selection he also had the players voting results available to him, and know which pitchers would be selected if other starters were made unavailable due to starting prior to the All-Star game. After starting pitcher Justin Verlander was made unavailable due to his start, the next pitcher selected was Sabathia who also started. The final spot was then awarded to Ogando who had not lost a game when the player voting took place.

August
Record (month, year) 16–12, 77–60

Prior to the last day of the month the Rangers picked up Michael Gonzalez (also from the Orioles) who received Pedro Strop in exchange, and re-acquired Matt Treanor from the Kansas City Royals.

September
Record (month, year) 19–6, 96–66

On Friday, September 23, the Rangers (playing at home) defeated the Mariners by a score of 5–3 and moving the magic number to 1 game.  Because the Angels had a scheduled start on the west coast, approximately 12,000 fans stayed inside Rangers Ballpark watching the outcome of that game on the scoreboard.  Once the Angels were defeated by the Oakland A's by a score of 3–1, making the Rangers American League West champions for the second consecutive year, the Rangers returned to the field to celebrate in front of the fans.  In a familiar scene, the Rangers celebrated using ginger ale on-field with Josh Hamilton, but later sprayed each other with champagne once inside the locker room.

By sweeping the Angels in the last away-game series, the Rangers also clinched home-field advantage in the first round of the playoffs with a record of 96–66, second in the American League only to the New York Yankees with a record of 97–65.

Post Season

ALDS: Tampa Bay Rays vs. Texas Rangers 
After losing the first game of a best-of-5 playoff series against Tampa Bay, the Rangers rebounded to win the next three games (including both games in Tampa Bay) to take the series 3–1. Colby Lewis' game 3 start was only the 17th game in postseason history to have a starter go at least 6 innings with 1 hit or less, and Lewis became the eighth pitcher to do so in a postseason game while recording 6 or more strikeouts.
The Rangers clinched the ALDS  in game four and became the third franchise to advance to the ALCS in consecutive years during the past decade. Matt Harrison lasted only 5 innings in game 4, but recorded 9 strikeouts in the outing. Harrison is the 10th player to throw 9 strikeouts or more in fewer than 6 innings in a postseason game. Adrián Beltré became the fifth player to hit 3 home runs in a playoff game, becoming the first to do so in a League Division Series game. The last time a player hit 3 home runs in a postseason game was 1978 by George Brett.

ALCS: Detroit Tigers vs. Texas Rangers 

(a) Game 1 suffered 2 rain delays totaling 1:50

(b) Game 2 was rescheduled from 10/9 to 10/10 due to rain

(c) Game 2 was an 11th-inning walk-off

(d) Game 4 suffered a pre-game rain delay totaling 2:13 and was extended into 11 innings

World Series: St. Louis Cardinals  vs. Texas Rangers

MLB draft and international free agents
On November 11, 2010, the Rangers signed free agent draftee Barret Loux. Loux was the 6th pick in the 2010 MLB draft from Texas A&M, by the Arizona Diamondbacks, but Loux failed a physical from the Diamondbacks and a $2 million draft bonus was voided. MLB commissioner Bud Selig ruled the Diamondbacks would receive a compensation pick for the 2011 MLB draft and Loux would be a free agent. Including Loux, the Rangers signed 5 of the first 50 picks from the 2010 MLB draft.

The Rangers signed 18-year-old Dutch shortstop Nick Urbanus in November. In December the Rangers signed three additional free agents; sixteen-year-old short stop Rougned Odor  from Venezuela, catcher Fernando Vivili from Dominican Republic, and pitcher Jose Leclair, also from the DR.

Roster

Player stats

Batting
Note: G = Games played; AB = At bats; R = Runs; H = Hits; 2B = Doubles; 3B = Triples; HR = Home runs; RBI = Runs batted in; SB = Stolen bases; BB = Walks; AVG = Batting average; SLG = Slugging average

Source:

Pitching
Note: W = Wins; L = Losses; ERA = Earned run average; G = Games pitched; GS Games started; SV = Saves; IP = Innings pitched; H = Hits allowed; R = Runs allowed; ER = Earned runs allowed; BB = Walks allowed; SO = Strikeouts

Source:

Season standings

Record vs. opponents

Game log 

|-  bgcolor="ffbbbb"
|- align="center" bgcolor="#bbffbb"
| 1 || April 1 || Red Sox || 9–5 || Darren Oliver (1–0) || Daniel Bard (0–1) || || 50,146 || 1–0 || 
|- align="center" bgcolor="#bbffbb"
| 2 || April 2 || Red Sox || 12–5 || Colby Lewis (1–0) || John Lackey (0–1) || || 48,356 || 2–0 || 
|- align="center" bgcolor="#bbffbb"
| 3 || April 3 || Red Sox || 5–1 || Matt Harrison (1–0) || Clay Buchholz (0–1) || || 46,326 || 3–0 || 
|- align="center" bgcolor="#bbffbb"
| 4 || April 4 || Mariners || 6–4 || Derek Holland (1–0) || Érik Bédard (0–1) || Neftalí Feliz (1) || 37,618 || 4–0 || 
|- align="center" bgcolor="#bbffbb"
| 5 || April 5 || Mariners || 3–2 || Alexi Ogando (1–0) || Michael Pineda (0–1) || Neftalí Feliz (2) || 30,953 || 5–0 ||  
|- align="center" bgcolor="#bbffbb"
| 6 || April 6 || Mariners || 7–3 || C. J. Wilson (1–0) || Félix Hernández (1–1) || || 25,049 || 6–0 || 
|- align="center" bgcolor="#bbbbbb"
| || April 8 || @ Orioles || colspan=7| Postponed (rain); Makeup: April 9 as part of a doubleheader
|- align="center" bgcolor="#ffbbbb"
| 7 || April 9 (Game 1) || @ Orioles || 0–5 || Zach Britton (2–0) || Colby Lewis (1–1) || || 36,243 || 6–1 || 
|- align="center" bgcolor="#bbffbb"
| 8 || April 9 (Game 2) || @ Orioles || 13–1 || Matt Harrison (2–0) || Jake Arrieta (1–1) ||  || 36,243 || 7–1 || 
|- align="center" bgcolor="#bbffbb"
| 9 || April 10 || @ Orioles || 3–0 || Derek Holland (2–0) || Jeremy Guthrie (1–1) || Neftalí Feliz (3) ||  21,452 || 8–1 || 
|- align="center" bgcolor="#bbffbb"
| 10 || April 11 || @ Tigers || 2–0 || Alexi Ogando (2–0) || Justin Verlander (1–1) || Neftalí Feliz (4) || 18,724 || 9–1 || 
|- align="center" bgcolor="#ffbbbb"
| 11 || April 12 || @ Tigers || 4–5 || José Valverde (1–0) || Darren O'Day (0–1) || || 20,609 || 9–2 || 
|- align="center" bgcolor= "#ffbbbb"
| 12 || April 13 || @ Tigers || 2–3 || José Valverde (2–0) || Darren Oliver (1–1) || || 20,526 || 9–3 || 
|- align="center" bgcolor="#bbffbb"
| 13 || April 15 || @ Yankees || 5–3 || Matt Harrison (3–0) || Iván Nova (1–1) || Neftalí Feliz (5) || 40,814 || 10–3 || 
|- align="center" bgcolor="#ffbbbb"
| 14 || April 16 || @ Yankees || 2–5 || Freddy García (1–0) || Derek Holland (2–1) || Mariano Rivera (6) || 41,876 || 10–4 || 
|- align="center" bgcolor="#ffbbbb"
| 15 || April 17 || @ Yankees || 5–6 || Rafael Soriano (1–0) || Arthur Rhodes (0–1) || Mariano Rivera (7) || 40,811 || 10–5 || 
|- align="center" bgcolor="#bbffbb"
| 16 || April 18 || Angels || 7–1 || C. J. Wilson (2–0) || Ervin Santana (0–2) || || 30,799 || 11–5 || 
|- align="center" bgcolor="#ffbbbb"
| 17 || April 19 || Angels || 4–15 || Matt Palmer (1–0) || Colby Lewis (1–2) || || 22,450 || 11–6 || 
|- align="center" bgcolor="#ffbbbb"
| 18 || April 20 || Angels || 1–4 || Jered Weaver (5–0) || Matt Harrison  (3–1) || || 31,967 || 11–7 || 
|- align="center" bgcolor="#bbffbb"
| 19 || April 22 || Royals || 11–6 || Derek Holland (3–1) || Jeff Francis (0–2) ||  || 45,769 || 12–7 || 
|- align="center" bgcolor="#bbffbb"
| 20 || April 23 || Royals || 3–1 || Alexi Ogando (3–0) || Kyle Davies (1–2) || Darren Oliver (1) || 45,506 || 13–7  || 
|- align="center" bgcolor="#bbffbb"
| 21 || April 24 || Royals || 8–7 || C. J. Wilson (3–0) || Bruce Chen (3–1) || Arthur Rhodes (1) || 28,284 || 14–7 || 
|- align="center" bgcolor="#ffbbbb"
| 22 || April 25 || Blue Jays || 4–6 || Kyle Drabek (2–0) || Colby Lewis (1–3) || Jon Rauch (4) || 22,915 || 14–8 || 
|- align="center" bgcolor="#ffbbbb"
| 23 || April 26 || Blue Jays || 3–10 || Jesse Litsch (2–1) || Matt Harrison (3–2) || || 21,755 || 14–9 || 
|- align="center" bgcolor="#bbffbb"
| 24 || April 27 || Blue Jays || 7–6 || Cody Eppley (1–0) || Octavio Dotel (1–1) || Darren Oliver (2) || 29,322 || 15–9 || 
|- align="center" bgcolor="#ffbbbb"
| 25 || April 28 || Blue Jays || 2–5 || Frank Francisco (1–0) || Darren Oliver (1–2) || || 24,121 || 15–10 || 
|- align="center" bgcolor="#ffbbbb"
| 26 || April 29 || @ Athletics || 1–3 || Trevor Cahill (4–0) || C. J. Wilson (3–1) || Brian Fuentes (7) || 17,226 || 15–11 || 
|- align="center" bgcolor="#bbffbb"
| 27 || April 30 || @ Athletics || 11–2 || Colby Lewis (2–3) || Brett Anderson (2–2) || || 27,285 || 16–11 || 
|-

|-  bgcolor="ffbbbb"
|- align="center" bgcolor="#ffbbbb"
| 28 || May 1 || @ Athletics || 2–7 || Gio González (3–2) || Matt Harrison (3–3) || || 15,178 || 16–12 || 
|- align="center" bgcolor="#ffbbbb"
| 29 || May 2 || @ Athletics || 4–5  (10)  || Grant Balfour (2–1) || Darren Oliver (1–3) || || 9,193 || 16–13 || 
|- align="center" bgcolor="#ffbbbb"
| 30 || May 3 || @ Mariners || 3–4 || David Pauley (1–0) || Pedro Strop (0–1) || Brandon League (8) || 12,759 || 16–14 || 
|- align="center" bgcolor="#bbffbb"
| 31 || May 4 || @ Mariners || 5–2 || C. J. Wilson (4–1) || Michael Pineda (4–2) || || 13,896 || 17–14 || 
|- align="center" bgcolor="#ffbbbb"
| 32 || May 5 || @ Mariners || 1–3 || Jason Vargas (2–2) || Colby Lewis (2–4) || Brandon League (9) || 14,205 || 17–15 || 
|- align="center" bgcolor="#ffbbbb"
| 33 || May 6 || Yankees || 1–4 || Iván Nova (3–2) || Matt Harrison (3–4) || Mariano Rivera (12) || 49,069 || 17–16 || 
|- align="center" bgcolor="#bbffbb"
| 34 || May 7 || Yankees || 7–5 || Arthur Rhodes (1–1) || Boone Logan (1–2) || Neftalí Feliz (6) || 49,574 || 18–16 || 
|- align="center" bgcolor="#ffbbbb"
| 35 || May 8 || Yankees || 5–12 || CC Sabathia (3–2) || Arthur Rhodes (1–2) || || 48,057 || 18–17 || 
|- align="center" bgcolor="#ffbbbb"
| 36 || May 9 || Athletics || 2–7 || Trevor Cahill (6–0) || C. J. Wilson (4–2) || || 24,375 || 18–18 || 
|- align="center" bgcolor="#bbffbb"
| 37 || May 10 || Athletics || 7–2 || Colby Lewis (3–4) || Brett Anderson (2–3) || || 31,655 || 19–18 || 
|- align="center" bgcolor="#bbbbbb"
|  || May 11 || Athletics || colspan=7| Postponed (rain); Makeup: July 7
|- align="center" bgcolor="#bbffbb"
| 38 || May 13 || Angels || 4–1 || Alexi Ogando (4–0) || Jered Weaver (6–3) || Neftalí Feliz (7) || 45,995 || 20–18 || 
|- align="center" bgcolor="#ffbbbb"
| 39 || May 14 || Angels || 2–3 || Scott Downs (1–0) || Darren Oliver (1–4) || Jordan Walden (7) || 47,663 || 20–19 || 
|- align="center" bgcolor="#bbffbb"
| 40 || May 15 || Angels || 5–4 || Mark Lowe (1–0) || Rich Thompson (1–2) || Neftalí Feliz (8) || 48,284 || 21–19 || 
|- align="center" bgcolor="#bbffbb"
| 41 || May 16 || @ White Sox || 4–0 || Colby Lewis (4–4) || Edwin Jackson (3–5) || || 23,048 || 22–19 || 
|- align="center" bgcolor="#ffbbbb"
| 42 || May 17 || @ White Sox || 3–4 || Jesse Crain (1–1) || Cody Eppley (1–1) || Sergio Santos (6) || 22,437 || 22–20 || 
|- align="center" bgcolor="#bbffbb"
| 43 || May 18 || @ Royals || 5–4 || Arthur Rhodes (2–2) || Jeremy Jeffress (1–1) || Mark Lowe (1) || 13,789 || 23–20 || 
|- align="center" bgcolor="#ffbbbb"
| 44 || May 19 || @ Royals || 1–2 (10) || Greg Holland (1–0) || Darren Oliver (1–5) || || 12,355 || 23–21 || 
|- align="center" bgcolor="#ffbbbb"
| 45 || May 20 || @ Phillies || 2–3 || Roy Halladay (6–3) ||C. J. Wilson (4–3) || Ryan Madson (8) || 45,358 || 23–22 || 
|- align="center" bgcolor="#ffbbbb"
| 46 || May 21 || @ Phillies || 0–2 || Cliff Lee (3–4) || Colby Lewis (4–5) || Ryan Madson (9) || 45,604 || 23–23 || 
|- align="center" bgcolor="#bbffbb"
| 47 || May 22 || @ Phillies || 2–0 || Matt Harrison (4–4) || Roy Oswalt (3–2) || Neftalí Feliz (9) || 45,633 || 24–23 || 
|- align="center" bgcolor="#bbffbb"
| 48 || May 23 || White Sox || 4–0 || Alexi Ogando (5–0) || John Danks (0–7) || || 30,861 || 25–23 || 
|- align="center" bgcolor="#ffbbbb"
| 49 || May 24 || White Sox || 6–8 || Tony Peña (1–1) || Brett Tomko (0–1) || Sergio Santos (7) || 35,524 || 25–24 || 
|- align="center" bgcolor="#bbffbb"
| 50 || May 25 || White Sox || 2–1 || C. J. Wilson (5–3) || Gavin Floyd (5–4) || Neftalí Feliz (10) || 32,382 || 26–24 || 
|- align="center" bgcolor="#ffbbbb"
| 51 || May 27 || Royals || 7–12 (14) || Blake Wood (2–0) || Dave Bush (0–1) || || 39,390 || 26–25 || 
|- align="center" bgcolor="#bbffbb"
| 52|| May 28 || Royals || 10–1 || Matt Harrison (5–4) || Sean O'Sullivan (2–4) ||  Yoshinori Tateyama (1)|| 40,240 || 27–25 || 
|- align="center" bgcolor="#bbffbb"
| 53 || May 29 || Royals || 7–6 || Arthur Rhodes (3–2) || Joakim Soria (3–2) || || 45,011 || 28–25 || 
|- align="center" bgcolor="#bbffbb"
| 54 || May 30 || @ Rays || 11–5 || Derek Holland (4–1) || Wade Davis (4–5) || || 14,203 || 29–25 || 
|- align="center" bgcolor="#ffbbbb"
| 55 || May 31 || @ Rays || 4–5 || Joel Peralta (2–3) || Arthur Rhodes (3–3) || Kyle Farnsworth (10) || 12,783 || 29–26 || 
|-

|-  bgcolor="ffbbbb"
|- align="center" bgcolor="#bbffbb"
| 56 || June 1 || @ Rays || 3–0 || Colby Lewis (5–5) || David Price (6–5) || Neftalí Feliz (11) || 13,725 || 30–26 || 
|- align="center" bgcolor="#bbffbb"
| 57 || June 2 || @ Indians || 7–4 || Michael Kirkman (1–0) || Carlos Carrasco (4–3) || Neftalí Feliz (12) || 15,336 || 31–26 || 
|- align="center" bgcolor="#bbffbb"
| 58 || June 3 || @ Indians || 11–2 || Alexi Ogando (6–0) || Justin Masterson (5–4) || || 27,458 || 32–26 || 
|- align="center" bgcolor="#bbffbb"
| 59 || June 4 || @ Indians || 4–0 || Derek Holland (5–1) || Fausto Carmona (3–7) || || 30,130 || 33–26 || 
|- align="center" bgcolor="#bbffbb"
| 60 || June 5 || @ Indians || 2–0 || C. J. Wilson (6–3) || Mitch Talbot (2–2) || Neftalí Feliz (13) || 20,621 || 34–26 || 
|- align="center" bgcolor="#ffbbbb"
| 61 || June 6 || Tigers || 7–13 || Max Scherzer (7–2) || Colby Lewis (5–6) || || 33,921 || 34–27 || 
|- align="center" bgcolor="#ffbbbb"
| 62 || June 7 || Tigers || 1–8 || Rick Porcello (6–3) || Matt Harrison (5–5) || || 35,165 || 34–28 || 
|- align="center" bgcolor="#bbffbb"
| 63 || June 8 || Tigers || 7–3 || Alexi Ogando (7–0) || Phil Coke (1–6) || || 40,388 || 35–28 || 
|- align="center" bgcolor="#ffbbbb"
| 64 || June 9 || @ Twins || 4–5 || Jim Hoey (1–2) || Mark Lowe (1–1) || || 38,761 || 35–29 ||
|- align="center" bgcolor="#bbffbb"
| 65 || June 10 || @ Twins || 9–3 || C. J. Wilson (7–3) || Brian Duensing (3–6) || || 38,907 || 36–29 || 
|- align="center" bgcolor="#ffbbbb"
| 66 || June 11 || @ Twins || 1–8 || Scott Baker (4–4) || Colby Lewis (5–7) || || 40,420 || 36–30 || 
|- align="center" bgcolor="#ffbbbb"
| 67 || June 12 || @ Twins || 1–6 || Francisco Liriano (4–6) || Matt Harrison (5–6) || || 39,281 || 36–31 || 
|- align="center" bgcolor="#ffbbbb"
| 68 || June 14 || @ Yankees || 4–12 || CC Sabathia (8–4) || Alexi Ogando (7–1) || || 43,457 || 36–32 || 
|- align="center" bgcolor="#ffbbbb" 
| 69 || June 15 || @ Yankees || 4–12 || Iván Nova (6–4) || Derek Holland (5–2) ||  || 45,969 || 36–33 || 
|- align="center" bgcolor="#ffbbbb" 
| 70 || June 16 || @ Yankees || 2–3 (12) || Cory Wade (1–0)|| Michael Kirkman (1–1) || || 47,487 || 36–34 || 
|- align="center" bgcolor="#bbffbb"
| 71 || June 17 || @ Braves || 6–2 || Colby Lewis (6–7) || Randall Delgado (0–1) || || 38,810 || 37–34 || 
|- align="center" bgcolor="#bbffbb"
| 72 || June 18 || @ Braves || 5–4 (10) || Mark Lowe (2–1) || Scott Proctor (1–1) || Neftalí Feliz (14) || 44,600 || 38–34 || 
|- align="center" bgcolor="#ffbbbb" 
| 73 || June 19 || @ Braves || 2–4 || Jair Jurrjens (9–3) || Alexi Ogando (7–2) || Craig Kimbrel (19) || 34,599 || 38–35 || 
|- align="center" bgcolor="#bbffbb"
| 74 || June 20 || Astros || 8–3 || Derek Holland (6–2) || J. A. Happ (3–9) || || 41,205 || 39–35 || 
|- align="center" bgcolor="#bbffbb"
| 75 || June 21 || Astros || 5–4 (11) || Yoshinori Tateyama (1–0) || Enerio Del Rosario (0–2) || || 33,533 || 40–35 || 
|- align="center" bgcolor="#ffbbbb" 
| 76 || June 22 || Astros || 3–5 || Mark Melancon (5–1) || Neftalí Feliz (0–1) || || 39,708 || 40–36 || 
|- align="center" bgcolor="#bbffbb"
| 77 || June 24 || Mets || 8–1 || Matt Harrison (6–6) || Mike Pelfrey (4–6) || || 46,092 || 41–36 || 
|- align="center" bgcolor="#ffbbbb"
| 78 || June 25 || Mets || 5–14 || Jon Niese (7–6) || Alexi Ogando (7–3) || || 37,292 || 41–37 || 
|- align="center" bgcolor="#ffbbbb"
| 79 || June 26 || Mets || 5–8 || Dillon Gee (8–1) || Derek Holland (6–3) || || 37,879 || 41–38 || 
|- align="center" bgcolor="#bbffbb"
| 80 || June 28 || @ Astros || 7–3 || C. J. Wilson (8–3) || Jordan Lyles (0–3) || Neftalí Feliz (15) || 29,132 || 42–38 || 
|- align="center" bgcolor="#bbffbb"
| 81 || June 29 || @ Astros || 3–2 || Colby Lewis (7–7) || Brett Myers (3–7) || Neftalí Feliz (16) || 24,472 || 43–38 || 
|- align="center" bgcolor="#ffbbbb"
| 82 || June 30 || @ Astros || 0–7 || Wandy Rodríguez (6–4) || Matt Harrison (6–7) || || 25,938 || 43–39 || 
|-

|-  bgcolor="ffbbbb"
|- align="center" bgcolor="#bbffbb"
| 83 || July 1 || Marlins || 15–5 || Alexi Ogando (8–3) || Aníbal Sánchez (6–2) || || 32,474 || 44–39 || 
|- align="center" bgcolor="#ffbbbb"
| 84 || July 2 || Marlins || 5–9 || Steve Cishek (1–1) || Derek Holland (6–4) || || 29,728 || 44–40 || 
|- align="center" bgcolor="#ffbbbb"
| 85 || July 3 || Marlins || 4–6 || Michael Dunn (5–5) || Mark Lowe (2–2) || Leo Núñez (23) || 46,092 || 44–41 || 
|- align="center" bgcolor="#bbffbb"
| 86 || July 4 || Orioles || 13–4 || Colby Lewis (8–7) || Chris Jakubauskas (2–2) || || 42,885 || 45–41 || 
|- align="center" bgcolor="#bbffbb"
| 87 || July 5 || Orioles || 4–2 || Tommy Hunter (1–0) || Jim Johnson (5–2) || Neftalí Feliz (17) || 25,945 || 46–41 || 
|- align="center" bgcolor="#bbffbb"
| 88 || July 6 || Orioles || 13–5 || Alexi Ogando (9–3) || Jeremy Guthrie (3–11) || || 31,953 || 47–41 || 
|- align="center" bgcolor="#bbffbb"
| 89 || July 7 || Athletics || 6–0 || Derek Holland (7–4) || Rich Harden (1–1) || || 35,041 || 48–41 || 
|- align="center" bgcolor="#bbffbb"
| 90 || July 8 || Athletics || 8–5 || C. J. Wilson (9–3) || Gio González (8–6) || || 37,858 || 49–41 || 
|- align="center" bgcolor="#bbffbb"
| 91 || July 9 || Athletics || 7–6 || Darren Oliver (2–5) || Andrew Bailey (0–2) || || 34,066 || 50–41 || 
|- align="center" bgcolor="#bbffbb"
| 92 || July 10 || Athletics || 2–0 || Matt Harrison (7–7) || Trevor Cahill (8–7) || Neftalí Feliz (18) || 33,834 || 51–41 || 
|- align="center" bgcolor="#bbffbb"
| 93 || July 14 || @ Mariners || 5–0 || Derek Holland (8–4) || Jason Vargas (6–7) || || 25,997 || 52–41 || 
|- align="center" bgcolor="#bbffbb"
| 94 || July 15 || @ Mariners || 4–0 || Colby Lewis (9–7) || Doug Fister (3–11) || Neftalí Feliz (19) || 30,551 || 53–41 || 
|- align="center" bgcolor="#bbffbb"
| 95 || July 16 || @ Mariners || 5–1 || C. J. Wilson (10–3) || Félix Hernández (8–8) ||  || 30,896 || 54–41 || 
|- align="center" bgcolor="#bbffbb"
| 96 || July 17 || @ Mariners || 3–1 || Matt Harrison (8–7) || Blake Beavan (1–1) || Neftalí Feliz (20) || 30,335 || 55–41 || 
|- align="center" bgcolor="#bbffbb"
| 97 || July 19 || @ Angels || 7–0 || Alexi Ogando (10–3) || Tyler Chatwood (5–6) || || 43,103 || 56–41 || 
|- align="center" bgcolor="#ffbbbb"
| 98 || July 20 || @ Angels || 8–9 || Hisanori Takahashi (3–2) || Tommy Hunter (1–1) || Jordan Walden (22) || 40,052 || 56–42 || 
|- align="center" bgcolor="#ffbbbb"
| 99 || July 21 || @ Angels || 0–1 || Jered Weaver (13–4) || C. J. Wilson (10–4) || Jordan Walden (23) || 38,315 || 56–43 || 
|- align="center" bgcolor="#bbffbb"
| 100 || July 22 || Blue Jays || 12–2 || Colby Lewis (10–7) || Jo-Jo Reyes (5–8) || || 37,360 || 57–43 || 
|- align="center" bgcolor="#bbffbb"
| 101 || July 23 || Blue Jays || 5–4 || Darren Oliver (3–5) || Marc Rzepczynski (2–3) || || 38,537 || 58–43 || 
|- align="center" bgcolor="#ffbbbb"
| 102 || July 24 || Blue Jays || 0–3 || Brett Cecil (3–4) || Alexi Ogando (10–4) || || 43,117 || 58–44 || 
|- align="center" bgcolor="#bbffbb"
| 103 || July 25 || Twins || 20–6 || Derek Holland (9–4) || Nick Blackburn (7–7) || || 35,573 || 59–44 || 
|- align="center" bgcolor="#ffbbbb"
| 104 || July 26 || Twins || 8–9 || Glen Perkins (3–1) || Neftalí Feliz (0–2) || Joe Nathan (8) || 30,581 || 59–45 || 
|- align="center" bgcolor="#ffbbbb"
| 105 || July 27 || Twins || 2–7 || Brian Duensing (8–8) || Colby Lewis (10–8) || || 35,950 || 59–46 || 
|- align="center" bgcolor="#bbffbb"
| 106 || July 28 || Twins || 4–1 || Matt Harrison (9–7) || Scott Baker (8–6) || Neftalí Feliz (21) || 30,406 || 60–46 || 
|- align="center" bgcolor="#ffbbbb"
| 107 || July 29 || @ Blue Jays || 2–3 || Brett Cecil (4–4) || Alexi Ogando (10–5) || Jon Rauch (9) || 19,287 || 60–47 || 
|- align="center" bgcolor="#bbffbb"
| 108 || July 30 || @ Blue Jays  || 3–0 || Derek Holland (10–4) || Brad Mills (0–1) || || 22,560 || 61–47 || 
|- align="center" bgcolor="#ffbbbb"
| 109 || July 31 || @ Blue Jays || 3–7 || Brandon Morrow (8–5) || C. J. Wilson (10–5) || || 45,629 || 61–48 || 
|-

|-  bgcolor="ffbbbb"
|- align="center" bgcolor="#ffbbbb"
| 110 || August 2 || @ Tigers || 5–6 || Joaquín Benoit (3–3) || Mike Adams (3–2) || José Valverde (29) || 29,067 || 61–49 || 
|- align="center" bgcolor="#ffbbbb"
| 111 || August 3 || @ Tigers || 4–5 || Doug Fister (4–12) || Matt Harrison (9–8) || José Valverde (30) || 33,596 || 61–50 || 
|- align="center" bgcolor="#bbffbb"
| 112 || August 4 || @ Tigers || 5–2 || Alexi Ogando (11–5) || Brad Penny (7–9) || Neftalí Feliz (22) || 40,497 || 62–50 || 
|- align="center" bgcolor="#bbffbb"
| 113 || August 5 || Indians || 8–7 (11) || Neftalí Feliz (1–2) || Rafael Pérez (4–2) ||  || 37,842 || 63–50 || 
|- align="center" bgcolor="#ffbbbb"
| 114 || August 6 || Indians || 5–7 || Frank Herrmann (2–0) || Neftalí Feliz (1–3) || Chris Perez (23) || 38,210 || 63–51 || 
|- align="center" bgcolor="#bbffbb"
| 115 || August 7 || Indians || 5–3 || Darren Oliver (4–5) || Joe Smith (2–3) || Mike Adams (2) || 37,431 || 64–51 || 
|- align="center" bgcolor="#bbffbb"
| 116 || August 8 || Mariners || 9–2 || Matt Harrison (10–8) || Charlie Furbush (2–4) ||  || 27,771 || 65–51 || 
|- align="center" bgcolor="#bbffbb"
| 117 || August 9 || Mariners ||  7–6 || Neftalí Feliz (2–3) || Jeff Gray (0–1) ||  || 25,214 || 66–51 || 
|- align="center" bgcolor="#ffbbbb"
| 118 || August 10 || Mariners || 3–4 || Jason Vargas (7–10) || Koji Uehara (1–2) || Brandon League (27) || 30,087 || 66–52 || 
|- align="center" bgcolor="#bbffbb"
| 119 || August 12 || @ Athletics || 9–1 || C. J. Wilson (11–5) || Brandon McCarthy (5–6) ||  || 20,288 || 67–52 || 
|- align="center" bgcolor="#bbffbb"
| 120 || August 13 || @ Athletics || 7–1 || Colby Lewis (11–8) || Trevor Cahill (9–11) ||  || 25,160 || 68–52 || 
|- align="center" bgcolor="#bbffbb"
| 121 || August 14 || @ Athletics || 7–6 || Mike Adams (1–0) || Andrew Bailey (0–3) || Neftalí Feliz (23) || 15,107 || 69–52 || 
|- align="center" bgcolor="#bbffbb"
| 122 || August 15 || @ Angels || 8–4 || Alexi Ogando (12–5) || Bobby Cassevah (1–1) || || 36,663 || 70–52 ||
|- align="center" bgcolor="#bbffbb" 
| 123 || August 16 || @ Angels || 7–1 || Derek Holland (11–4) || Tyler Chatwood (6–9) || || 43,711 || 71–52 || 
|- align="center" bgcolor="#bbffbb" 
| 124 || August 17 || @ Angels || 4–3 || C. J. Wilson (12–5) || Ervin Santana (9–9) || Neftalí Feliz (24) || 36,581 || 72–52 || 
|- align="center" bgcolor="#ffbbbb"
| 125 || August 18 || @ Angels || 1–2 || Horacio Ramírez (1–0) || Mike Adams (4–3) || || 41,123 || 72–53 || 
|- align="center" bgcolor="#bbffbb" 
| 126 || August 19 || @ White Sox || 7–4 || Yoshinori Tateyama (2–0) || Jake Peavy (5–6) || Neftalí Feliz (25) || 28,308 || 73–53 || 
|- align="center" bgcolor="#ffbbbb"
| 127 || August 20 || @ White Sox || 2–3 || Jesse Crain (8–3) || Koji Uehara (1–3) || Sergio Santos (26) || 30,021 || 73–54 || 
|- align="center" bgcolor="#ffbbbb"
| 128 || August 21 || @ White Sox || 0–10 || Gavin Floyd (11–10) || Derek Holland (11–5) || || 25,033 || 73–55 || 
|- align="center" bgcolor="#bbffbb" 
| 129 || August 22 || Red Sox || 4–0 || C. J. Wilson (13–5) || Érik Bédard (4–9) || || 33,920 || 74–55 || 
|- align="center" bgcolor="#ffbbbb"
| 130 || August 23 || Red Sox || 5–11 || John Lackey (12–9) || Colby Lewis (11–9) || || 25,705 || 74–56 || 
|- align="center" bgcolor="#ffbbbb"
| 131 || August 24 || Red Sox || 2–13 || Josh Beckett (11–5) || Matt Harrison (10–9) || || 30,724 || 74–57 || 
|- align="center" bgcolor="#ffbbbb"
| 132 || August 25 || Red Sox || 0–6 || Andrew Miller (6–1) || Alexi Ogando (12–6) || || 29,729 || 74–58 || 
|- align="center" bgcolor="#bbffbb" 
| 133 || August 26 || Angels || 11–7 || Derek Holland (12–5) || Dan Haren (13–7) || || 38,256 || 75–58 ||  
|- align="center" bgcolor="#ffbbbb"
| 134 || August 27 || Angels || 4–8 || Ervin Santana (10–9) || C. J. Wilson (13–6) || Hisanori Takahashi (2) || 48,453 || 75–59 || 
|- align="center" bgcolor="#bbffbb"
| 135 || August 28 || Angels || 9–5 || Darren Oliver (5–5) || Jered Weaver (15–7) ||  || 40,018 || 76–59 ||
|- align="center" bgcolor="#bbffbb"
| 136 || August 30 || Rays || 2–0 || Scott Feldman (1–0) || Jeremy Hellickson (11–10) || Neftalí Feliz (26) || 40,018 || 77–59 ||
|- align="center" bgcolor="#ffbbbb"
| 137 || August 31 || Rays || 1–4 || James Shields (13–10) || Alexi Ogando (12–7) ||  || 40,018 || 77–60 ||
|-

|-  bgcolor="ffbbbb"
|- align="center" bgcolor="#bbffbb"
| 138 || September 1 || Rays || 7–2 || C. J. Wilson (14–6) || Jeff Niemann (9–6) ||  || 26,220 || 78–60 ||
|- align="center" bgcolor="#bbffbb"
| 139 || September 2 || @ Red Sox || 13–0 || Derek Holland (13–5) || Andrew Miller (6–2) ||  || 38,083 || 79–60 ||
|- align="center" bgcolor="#ffbbbb"
| 140 || September 3 || @ Red Sox || 7–12 || Érik Bédard (5–9) || Colby Lewis (11–10) ||  || 38,083 || 79–61 ||
|- align="center" bgcolor="#bbffbb"
| 141 || September 4 || @ Red Sox || 11–4 || Matt Harrison (11–9) || Lackey (12–11) || || 37,744 || 80–61 ||
|- align="center" bgcolor="#ffbbbb"
| 142 || September 5 || @ Rays || 1–5 || Shields (14–10) || Feldman (1–1) || || 13,130 || 80–62 ||
|- align="center" bgcolor="#bbffbb"
| 143 || September 6 || @ Rays || 8–0 || C. J. Wilson (15–6) || Jeff Niemann (9–7) || || 11,611 || 81–62 ||
|- align="center" bgcolor="#ffbbbb"
| 144 || September 7 || @ Rays || 4–5 || Jake McGee (2–1) || Mark Lowe (2–3) || || 11,190 || 81–63 ||
|- align="center" bgcolor="#bbffbb"
| 145 || September 9 || Athletics || 13–4 || Colby Lewis (12–10) || Brandon McCarthy (8–8) || || 36,706 || 82–63 ||
|- align="center" bgcolor="#ffbbbb"
| 146 || September 10 || Athletics || 7–8 || Trevor Cahill (11–13) || Alexi Ogando (12–8) || Andrew Bailey (20) || 46,151 || 82–64 ||
|- align="center" bgcolor="#bbffbb"
| 147 || September 11 || Athletics || 8–1 || C. J. Wilson (16–6) || Josh Outman (3–5) || || 46,727 || 83–64 ||
|- align="center" bgcolor="#bbffbb"
| 148 || September 13 || Indians || 10–4 || Matt Harrison (12–9) || Justin Masterson (11–10) || || 30,107 || 84–64 || 
|- align="center" bgcolor="#bbffbb"
| 149 || September 14 || Indians || 9–1 || Derek Holland (14–5) || David Huff || || 38,710 || 85–64 ||
|- align="center" bgcolor="#bbffbb"
| 150 || September 15 || Indians || 7–4 || Alexi Ogando (13–8) || Fausto Carmona || || 44,242 || 86–64 ||
|- align="center" bgcolor="#ffbbbb"
| 151 || September 16 || @ Mariners || 0–4 || Blake Beavan (5–5) || C. J. Wilson (16–7) || || 17,607 || 86–65 ||
|- align="center" bgcolor="#bbffbb"
| 152 || September 17 || @ Mariners || 7–6 || Colby Lewis (13–10) || Anthony Vasquez (1–4) || Neftalí Feliz (27) || 22,159 || 87–65 ||
|- align="center" bgcolor="#bbffbb"
| 153 || September 18 || @ Mariners || 3–0 || Matt Harrison (13–9) || Félix Hernández (14–13) || Neftalí Feliz (28) || 21,479 || 88–65 ||
|- align="center" bgcolor="#bbffbb"
| 154 || September 20 || @ Athletics || 7–2 || Derek Holland (15–5) || Rich Harden (4–4) || || 13,635 || 89–65 ||
|- align="center" bgcolor="#bbffbb"
| 155 || September 21 || @ Athletics || 3–2 || Koji Uehara (2–3) || Grant Balfour (4–2) || Neftalí Feliz (29) || 19,589 || 90–65 ||
|- align="center" bgcolor="#ffbbbb"
| 156 || September 22 || @ Athletics || 3–4 || Grant Balfour (5–2) || Mike Adams (4–4) || Andrew Bailey (21) || 14,090 || 90–66 ||
|- align="center" bgcolor="#bbffbb"
| 157 || September 23 || Mariners || 5–3 || Matt Harrison (14–9) || Anthony Vasquez (1–5) || Neftalí Feliz (30) || 43,874 || 91–66 ||
|- align="center" bgcolor="#bbffbb"
| 158 || September 24 || Mariners || 7–3 || Scott Feldman (2–1) || Félix Hernández (14–14) || || 40,242 || 92–66 ||
|- align="center" bgcolor="#bbffbb"
| 159 || September 25 || Mariners || 12–5 || Derek Holland (16–5) || Charlie Furbush (4–10) || || 43,508 || 93–66 ||
|- align="center" bgcolor="#bbffbb"
| 160 || September 26 || @ Angels || 4–3 || Mark Hamburger (1–0) || Dan Haren (16–10) || Neftalí Feliz (31) || 39,716 || 94–66 ||
|- align="center" bgcolor="#bbffbb"
| 161 || September 27 || @ Angels || 10–3 || Colby Lewis (14–10) || Tyler Chatwood (6–11) || || 39,529 || 95–66 ||
|- align="center" bgcolor="#bbffbb"
| 162 || September 28 || @ Angels || 3–1 || Mike Adams (5–4) || Jordan Walden (5–5) || Neftalí Feliz (32) || 39,612 || 96–66 ||
|-

|-  bgcolor="ffbbbb"
|- align="center" bgcolor="#ffbbbb"
| 1 || September 30 || Rays || 0–9 || Matt Moore (1–0) || C. J. Wilson (0–1) || || 50,498 || 0–1 || 
|- align="center" bgcolor="#bbffbb"
| 2 || October 1 || Rays || 8–6 || Derek Holland (1–0) || James Shields (0–1) || Neftalí Feliz (1) || 51,351 || 1–1 || 
|- align="center" bgcolor="#bbffbb"
| 3 || October 3 || @ Rays || 4–3 || Colby Lewis (1–0) || David Price (0–1) || Neftalí Feliz (2) || 32,828 || 2–1 || 
|- align="center" bgcolor="#bbffbb"
| 4 || October 4 || @ Rays || 4–3 || Matt Harrison (1–0) || Jeremy Hellickson (0–1) || Neftalí Feliz (3) || 28,299 || 3–1 || 
|-

|-  bgcolor="ffbbbb"
|- align="center" bgcolor="#bbffbb"
| 1 || October 8 || Tigers || 3–2 || Alexi Ogando (1–0) || Justin Verlander (0–1) || Neftalí Feliz (1) || 50,114 || 1–0 || 
|- align="center" bgcolor="#bbffbb"
| 2 || October 10 || Tigers || 7–3  (11)  || Mike Adams (1–0) || Ryan Perry (0–1) || || 51,227 || 2–0 || 
|- align="center" bgcolor="#ffbbbb"
| 3 || October 11 || @ Tigers || 2–5 || Doug Fister (1–0) || Colby Lewis (0–1) || José Valverde (1) || 41,905 || 2–1 || 
|- align="center" bgcolor="#bbffbb"
| 4 || October 12 || @ Tigers || 7–3 || Scott Feldman (1–0) || José Valverde (0–1) || || 42,234 || 3–1 || 
|- align="center" bgcolor="#ffbbbb"
| 5 || October 13 || @ Tigers || 5–7 || Justin Verlander (1–1) || C. J. Wilson (0–1) || Phil Coke (1) || 41,908 || 3–2 || 
|- align="center" bgcolor="#bbffbb"
| 6 || October 15 || Tigers || 15–5 || Alexi Ogando (2–0) || Max Scherzer (0–1) || || 51,508 || 4–2 || 
|-

|-  bgcolor="ffbbbb"
|- align="center" bgcolor="#ffbbbb"
| 1 || October 19 || @ Cardinals || 2–3 || Chris Carpenter (1–0) || C. J. Wilson (0–1) || Jason Motte (1) || 46,406 || 0–1 || 
|- align="center" bgcolor="#bbffbb"
| 2 || October 20 || @ Cardinals || 2–1 || Mike Adams (1–0) || Jason Motte (0–1) || Neftalí Feliz (1) || 47,288 || 1–1 || 
|- align="center" bgcolor="#ffbbbb"
| 3 || October 22 || Cardinals || 7–16 || Lance Lynn (1–0) || Matt Harrison (0–1) ||  || 51,462 || 1–2 || 
|- align="center" bgcolor="#bbffbb"
| 4 || October 23 || Cardinals || 4–0 || Derek Holland (1–0) || Edwin Jackson (0–1) ||  || 51,539 || 2–2 || 
|- align="center" bgcolor="#bbffbb"
| 5 || October 24 || Cardinals || 4–2 || Darren Oliver (1–0) || Octavio Dotel (0–1) || Neftalí Feliz (2) || 51,459 || 3–2 || 
|- align="center" bgcolor="#ffbbbb"
| 6 || October 27 || @ Cardinals || 9–10 (11) || Jake Westbrook (1–0) || Mark Lowe (0–1) || || 47,325 || 3–3 || 
|- align="center" bgcolor="#ffbbbb"
| 7 || October 28 || @ Cardinals || 2–6 || Chris Carpenter (2–0) || Matt Harrison (0–2) || || 47,399 || 3–4 || 
|-

Farm system

References

External links
2011 Texas Rangers season at Official Site
2011 Texas Rangers season at Baseball Reference
Lone Star Ball: Welcome to the Angrydome
Jamey Newberg's The Newberg Report
Baseball Time in Arlington, a SweetSpot Network; an ESPN Affiliate
Dallassportsnetwork.tv: Everything but the games
MLB Trade Rumors, Texas Rangers
TR Sullivan's Postcards from Elysian Fields, an MLBlog
Dallasnews.com's Rangers blog
Star Telegram Rangers

Texas Rangers seasons
Texas Rangers
American League West champion seasons
American League champion seasons
Range